TD Tower may refer to:

the six towers of Toronto-Dominion Centre, Toronto, Ontario, Canada
TD Tower (Vancouver), British Columbia, Canada
TD Centre (Halifax, Nova Scotia), Canada
TD Tower (Edmonton), Alberta, Canada
TD Canada Trust Tower, at Brookfield Place (Toronto), Ontario, Canada
TD Canada Trust Tower (Calgary), Alberta, Canada